Ricardo Antonio Roberty Moreno (born October 12, 1982 in Acarigua, Portuguesa) is an amateur Venezuelan freestyle wrestler, who competed in the men's middleweight category. He won a bronze medal for the 74 kg division at the 2011 Pan American Games in Guadalajara, Mexico. Roberty also captured a silver medal in the same division at the 2006 Central American and Caribbean Games in Cartagena, Colombia, and eventually defeated Dominican Republic's Ysidro Alexis for the gold at the 2010 Central American and Caribbean Games in Mayagüez, Puerto Rico.

Roberty represented Venezuela at the 2012 Summer Olympics in London, where he competed for the men's 74 kg class. He lost the qualifying round match to Guinea-Bissau wrestler and two-time Olympian Augusto Midana, with a three-set technical score (0–1, 1–0, 1–2), and a classification point score of 1–3.

References

External links
NBC Olympics Profile
 

1982 births
Living people
Olympic wrestlers of Venezuela
Wrestlers at the 2012 Summer Olympics
Wrestlers at the 2011 Pan American Games
Pan American Games bronze medalists for Venezuela
People from Acarigua
Venezuelan male sport wrestlers
Pan American Games medalists in wrestling
Central American and Caribbean Games gold medalists for Venezuela
Central American and Caribbean Games silver medalists for Venezuela
Competitors at the 2006 Central American and Caribbean Games
Competitors at the 2010 Central American and Caribbean Games
Central American and Caribbean Games medalists in wrestling
Medalists at the 2011 Pan American Games
20th-century Venezuelan people
21st-century Venezuelan people